Manuel Walter (born 11 March 1986 in  Gernsbach, Germany) is a German curler, currently playing third on the team of Alexander Baumann. Walter has competed at the 2016 and 2017 World Men's Curling Championships.

References

1986 births
German male curlers
People from Gernsbach
Sportspeople from Karlsruhe (region)
Living people
21st-century German people